This article lists Fellows of the Royal Society who were elected in 2022.

Fellows

 Fernando Alday
 Simon Boulton
 Graham Burton
 Jason Chin
 Roberto Cipolla
 Martin Dawson
 Douglas Easton
 Robin Franklin
 Pierre Friedlingstein
 Eileen Furlong
 Vincent Fusco
 Richard Gilbertson
 Peter Goadsby
 Alain Goriely
 Alexander Gould
 Andrew Harrison
 Jane Hillston
 Peter Hore
 Nicholas Jennings
 Sandra Knapp
 Susan Lea
 Paul Lehner
 Andrew Livingston
 Juergen Maier
 Roberto Maiolino
 Oscar Marín
 Angelos Michaelides
 Irene Miguel-Aliaga
 Mark Newman
 Rachel O'Reilly
 Menelas Pangalos
 Robert Pressey
 Trevor Price
 Oliver Pybus
 Jordan Raff
 Andrew Rambaut
 Ros Rickaby
 Richard Robson
 Yvonne Rogers
 Jamie Rossjohn
 Paul Seymour
 Ben Sheldon
 Ian Shipsey
 Kate Storey 
 Ilya Sutskever
 Michael Thackeray
 Zeblon Vilakazi
 Carola G. Vinuesa
 Vaclav Vitek
 Sally Ward
 Rachel Wood

Honorary Fellows

 Tedros Ghebreyesus, Director General, World Health Organization

Foreign Members

 Charles Bennett
 Donald Canfield
 Titia de Lange
 George Gao
 Michael Grätzel
 
 Maria Leptin
 Carlos Nobre
 Peter Scholze
 Howard Stone

References

2022
2022 in the United Kingdom
2022 in science